Leigh Groves (born 11 December 1973) is an Australian former professional rugby league footballer who played in the 1990s. A  or er, Groves played for the Gold Coast Seagulls and North Queensland Cowboys.

Playing career
A Cairns junior, Groves made his first grade debut for the Gold Coast Seagulls in Round 13 of the 1993 NSWRL season. He spent two seasons on the Gold Coast, playing five games.

In 1995, Groves returned north to join the newly-established North Queensland Cowboys, coming off the bench in their inaugural game against the Sydney Bulldogs. During his two seasons at the club he played 19 games, scoring one try.

Later in his career, Groves played for the Redcliffe Dolphins and Ipswich Jets in the Queensland Cup.

Statistics

NSWRL/ARL

References

1973 births
Living people
Australian rugby league players
Gold Coast Chargers players
North Queensland Cowboys players
Redcliffe Dolphins players
Ipswich Jets players
Rugby league players from Cairns
Rugby league props
Rugby league second-rows